Léon la lune is a 1956 French short documentary film directed by Alain Jessua. The film won the Prix Jean Vigo in 1957. The film documents an old drifter in Paris in the poetic realist style.

Jessua was inspired by Jean-Paul Clébert's book Paris Insolite (1952) and decided to make a film about a clochard or tramp. The poet and novelist Robert Giraud, an expert on the Parisian underworld, introduced Jessua to Léon la Lune, a vagrant whose real name was Leon Boudeville, and suggested that they follow him from day to night. After completing the film Giraud showed it to the poet and screenwriter Jacques Prévert who wrote an introduction and asked Henri Crolla to contribute some music to the film.

Léon la lune also appeared in the series Clochards by Robert Doisneau, the pioneer of humanist photojournalism.

Cast
 Léon la Lune aka Leon Boudeville

See also
Poetic realism

References

External links

 Prix Jean Vigo, February 10–December 30, 2006, Moma - http://www.moma.org/visit/calendar/film_screenings/3140
 Robert Giraud, scénariste d’Alain Jessua, Le Monde blog, 1 January 2007, https://web.archive.org/web/20120513083221/http://robertgiraud.blog.lemonde.fr/2007/01/01/robert-giraud-scenariste-dalain-jessua/
 Forum Des Images, 

1956 films
French short documentary films
1950s French-language films
1956 documentary films
1956 short films
Films directed by Alain Jessua
Documentary films about homelessness
Documentary films about Paris
1950s short documentary films
1960s French films
1950s French films
French black-and-white films